Admiral Jenkins may refer to:

Ian Jenkins (Royal Navy officer) (1944–2009), British Royal Navy vice admiral
Thornton A. Jenkins (1811–1893), U.S. Navy rear admiral
William A. Jenkins (1917–2022), U.S. Coast Guard rear admiral